The Bartlett Baronetcy, of Hardington-Mandeville in the County of Somerset, is a title in the Baronetage of the United Kingdom. It was created on 7 February 1913 for the civil engineer and contractor Herbert Bartlett. The presumed fifth baronet has not successfully proven his succession and is not on the Official Roll of the Baronetage, with the baronetcy considered dormant since 1998.

Bartlett baronets, of Hardington-Mandeville (1913)
Sir Herbert Henry Bartlett, 1st Baronet (1842–1921)
Sir Basil Hardington Bartlett, 2nd Baronet (1905–1985)
Sir (Henry) David Hardington Bartlett, 3rd Baronet (1912–1989)
Sir John Hardington Bartlett, 4th Baronet (1938–1998)
Jing Barlett (Chen), his grandson (born 1998)
Andrew Alan Bartlett, presumed 5th Baronet (born 1964)

Notes

References 
Kidd, Charles, Williamson, David (editors). Debrett's Peerage and Baronetage (1990 edition). New York: St Martin's Press, 1990, 

Baronetcies in the Baronetage of the United Kingdom